Feast (stylized as .Feast) is a rock band from Indonesia. The current members include Baskara Putra, Adnan S.P, Dicky Renanda P, F. Fikriawan W, and Adrianus Aristo H.

Career 
.Feast came into formation when the members were still studying Social and Political Science at the University of Indonesia. In 2014, they released their debut album titled "Camkan" which spots Religious Freedom in Indonesia.

After Camkan, they had planned to make another album titled "Convictions", however, they went inactive for a year instead. They later returned with a single, "Wives of ゴジラ/Gojira (We Belong Dead)" featuring Janitra Satriani, and in July 2017, they released "Sectumsempra", inspired by Harry Potter, featuring Yudhis from Rachun Band.

On 18 September 2017, they released an EP titled Multiverses featuring many collaborators including the rapper Ramengvrl, Elephant Kind's vocalist Bam Mastro, Mardial, Oscar Lolang, Haikal Azizi, and many more.

On 13 July 2018, .Feast released a single for an upcoming album titled "Peradaban". On 10 August 2018, .Feast released a second single featuring Rayssa Dynta titled "Berita Kehilangan", which points out criminalization, rape, rebellion, and terrorism cadres in Indonesia. In late 2018, Baskara Putra started a solo career under the name "Hindia".

In 2019, .Feast released another EP called "Membangun dan Menghancurkan" containing a single titled "Dalam Hitungan", which satirizes political polarization, religious bigotry, and Internet addiction in Indonesia, and another single titled "Tarian Penghancur Raya" which spots environmental and cultural threat issues. Also in 2019, .Feast & The Panturas released a single titled "Gelora" for the 2019 SEA Games in Philippines.

Members 

 Baskara Putra – vocalist, synthesizer
 Adnan S.P. – guitar
 Dicky Renanda – guitar
 F. Fikriawan – bass
 Adrianus Aristo Haryo (Bodat) – drum
 Syafiq Shohemi- kompang
 Fahmi Zaki - gamelan
 Imran Mustafa - recoder

Discography

Studio albums 
 Multiverses (2017)
 Abdi Lara Insani (2022)

Extended plays 
 Beberapa Orang Memaafkan (2018)
 Uang Muka (2020)

Singles

References 

Indonesian rock music groups
Indonesian stoner rock musical groups